Al-Shoulla Stadium is a multi-use stadium in Al-Kharj, Saudi Arabia. It is currently used mostly for football matches, on club level by Al-Shoulla of the Saudi Professional League. The stadium has a capacity of 8,000.

External links
Goalzz.com Profile

Football venues in Saudi Arabia